The Gerald Loeb Award is given annually for multiple categories of business reporting. A Special Book Award was given in 1969. An award for Books was given in 1974, and the category was called Business Book from 2006 to 2012.

Gerald Loeb Special Book Award (1969)

 1969: The Money Game by George J. W. Goodman, Random House

Gerald Loeb Award for Books (1974)

 1974: The Go-Go Years by John Brooks, Weybright and Talley

Gerald Loeb Award for Business Book (2006–2012)

 2006: DisneyWar by James B. Stewart, Simon & Schuster
 2007: The Long Tail: Why the Future of Business is Selling Less of More by Chris Anderson, Hyperion
 2008: Mine's Bigger: Tom Perkins and the Making of the Greatest Sailing Machine Ever Built by David A. Kaplan, William Morrow

"This tale of venture capital pioneer Tom Perkins and his quest to build the world’s greatest clipper ship was a compelling story about one of the most influential figures in the Silicon Valley. Kaplan artfully wove great reporting into his narrative, making for an entertaining, smart and powerful book."

 2009: Trillion Dollar Meltdown: Easy Money, High Rollers, and the Great Credit Crash by Charles R. Morris, PublicAffairs 
 2010: Too Big to Fail: The Inside Story of How Wall Street and Washington Fought to Save the Financial System - and Themselves by Andrew Ross Sorkin, Penguin Group (USA) - Viking
 2011: More Money Than God: Hedge Funds and the Making of a New Elite by Sebastian Mallaby, The Penguin Press
 2012: Steve Jobs by Walter Isaacson, Simon & Schuster
 2012: (Honorable Mention) Poor Economics by Abhijit V. Banerjee and Esther Duflo

References

External links
 Gerald Loeb Award historical winners list

American journalism awards
Gerald Loeb Award winners